USS LST-460 was a United States Navy  used in the Asiatic-Pacific Theater during World War II. As with many of her class, the ship was never named. Instead, she was referred to by her hull designation.

Construction
The ship was laid down on 26 September 1942, under Maritime Commission (MARCOM) contract, MC hull 980, by  Kaiser Shipyards, Vancouver, Washington; launched 31 October 1942; and commissioned on 15 February 1943.

Service history
During World War II, LST-460 was assigned to the Asiatic-Pacific theater. She took part in the consolidation of the southern Solomons in June 1943; the New Georgia Campaign which included the Vella Lavella occupation in August 1943; the Treasury Island landings, November 1943; the Hollandia operation in April 1944; the Western New Guinea operation, the Morotai landing in September 1944; the Leyte operation in November 1944; the Lingayen Gulf landings during the Lingayen Gulf landings of December 1945.

LST-460 was lost in action due to an enemy aircraft attack on 21 December 1944, off Mindoro, Philippines. She was struck from the Navy list on 19 January 1945.

Honors and awards
LST-460 earned six battle stars for her World War II service.

Notes 

Citations

Bibliography 

Online resources

External links

 

1942 ships
World War II amphibious warfare vessels of the United States
LST-1-class tank landing ships of the United States Navy
S3-M2-K2 ships
Ships built in Vancouver, Washington
Maritime incidents in April 1945